The 1987 Bob Jane T-Marts 500 was the ninth round of the 1987 World Touring Car Championship. The race, which was open to Group A Touring Cars, was held on 11 October 1987 at  Calder Park Raceway in outer Melbourne, Victoria, Australia on the rarely used combined circuit which incorporated both the recently redeveloped (1986) road course and the newly completed, high banked (24°) NASCAR-style “Thunderdome” oval.

The combined oval/road course was 4.216 km (2.620 mi) long and the race was run over 120 laps.

The race was won by Steve Soper and Pierre Dieudonné driving a Ford Sierra RS500 for Eggenberger Motorsport. Both Klaus Ludwig's pole time of 1:42.92 and Andrew Miedecke's fastest race lap of 1:45.03 in their respective Ford Sierra RS500's were faster than the pole time set in the only other Group A Touring Car race held on the combined oval/road course, the Yokohama/Bob Jane T-Marts 300 held two months previously on 9 August.

Classes
Cars competed in three classes based on engine capacity.
 Class A: Over 2500cc
 Class B: 1601-2500cc
 Class C: Up to 1600cc

Results

Statistics
 Pole Position – #7 Klaus Ludwig – 1.42.92
 Fastest Lap – #35 Andrew Miedecke – 1:45.03
 Average Speed – 139.916 km/h

See also
1987 Australian Touring Car season

References

Further reading
 Australian Motor Racing Yearbook, 1987/88

External  links
 Images from the 1987 WTCC round at Calder
 More images from the 1987 WTCC round at Calder

1987 in Australian motorsport
1987 World Touring Car Championship season
Auto races in Australia